Santiago is a district of the Paraíso canton, in the Cartago province of Costa Rica.

Geography 
Santiago has an area of  km² and an elevation of  metres.

Demographics 

For the 2011 census, Santiago had a population of  inhabitants.

Transportation

Road transportation 
The district is covered by the following road routes:
 National Route 10
 National Route 224
 National Route 404

References 

Districts of Cartago Province
Populated places in Cartago Province